Rechka Vydrino is a rural locality (a settlement) in Kabansky District, Republic of Buryatia, Russia. The population was 8 as of 2010. There are 2 streets.

Geography 
Rechka Vydrino is located 149 km southwest of Kabansk (the district's administrative centre) by road. Kedrovaya is the nearest rural locality.

References 

Rural localities in Kabansky District
Populated places on Lake Baikal